Inception: The Subconscious Jams 1994–1995 is a compilation of unreleased tracks by the band Download.

Track listing
 "Primitive Tekno Jam" (Key/Goettel) – 3:23
 "Bee Sting Sickness" (Key/Goettel) – 8:04
 "Weed Acid Techno" (Key/Goettel) – 8:19
 "Recovered" (Key/Goettel/Philth) – 5:26
 "Left the Radio On" (Key/Hiwatt/radio) – 3:45
 "Deepdark Modular" (Key/Goettel/Philth/Spybey) – 3:44
 "So Easy to Kill" (Key/Goettel) – 7:11
 "This Is Quality Grass" (Key/Goettel/Philth) – 3:43
 "Krackerzz" (Key/Goettel/Spybey) – 5:22
 "30065 Morningview Dr." (Key/Goettel) – 7:55
 "Dubplate From Ochy" (Key/Goettel/DJ Egyptian) – 5:37
 "Thats.Our.Process" (Key/Goettel/Philth) – 4:48
 "Wavestation Phuq" (Key/Goettel/Philth/Spybey) – 5:40
 "Tweeter Blower" (Key/Goettel) – 4:06
 "800-525" (Key/Goettel/Philth/Spybey) – 2:44

Personnel
cEvin Key
Philth
D.R. Goettel
Mark Spybey
Simon Paul, Scott Graham (cover art, layout)

Guests
Ken "Hiwatt" Marshall (electronics, 5)
DJ Egyptian (vocals, 11)

Notes
Originally sold as an exclusive subscription-only release through cEvin Key's personal label in a limited run of 1,000 copies. It was later sold as a digipak in wider release.

References

Download (band) albums
2002 compilation albums